Garrett station was a railway station in Garrett, Indiana.

History
The town of Garrett was established by the Baltimore and Ohio Railroad when the line was extended here in 1875. The station would be served by several of the company's named trains, including the Diplomat, Capitol Limited, and Washington–Chicago Express. Service ended in 1971 when the Capitol Limited was discontinued.

The station became a stop on the Amtrak Broadway Limited on November 10, 1990 when the service was rerouted over the former Baltimore and Ohio line through Ohio and Indiana. Amtrak Thruway bus service provided a link to Fort Wayne, which was one of the cities bypassed — this operated until April 2, 1995. Passenger service ended with the discontinuation of the Broadway Limited on September 9, 1995. The station building was demolished that same year.

References

Former Baltimore and Ohio Railroad stations
Former Amtrak stations in Indiana
Railway stations in the United States opened in 1875
Railway stations closed in 1971
Railway stations in the United States opened in 1990
Railway stations closed in 1995
Transportation buildings and structures in DeKalb County, Indiana
Demolished railway stations in the United States